Marjorie Prime is a 2017 American science-fiction film written and directed by Michael Almereyda, based on Jordan Harrison's play of the same name. It stars Jon Hamm, Tim Robbins, Geena Davis, and Lois Smith. Footage was screened for buyers at the 66th Berlin International Film Festival. It premiered at the 2017 Sundance Film Festival.

Plot
Around the year 2050, 85-year-old Marjorie (Smith) is experiencing the first symptoms of Alzheimer's disease. To bring her comfort her daughter Tess (Davis) and son-in-law Jon (Robbins) hire a service called Prime, designed to assist Alzheimer patients by creating holographic projections of deceased family members which are "fed" with the patients' memories so that they can "retell" them back in case they forget them. Marjorie has chosen a younger version of her late husband Walter (Hamm), who died fifteen years ago. This choice disturbs Tess as she does not trust the system's functionalities, so she does not talk to Walter's hologram. Marjorie tells stories of her life to Walter Prime and enjoys listening to him tell them back, usually asking him to embellish some to make them better and prettier the next time he tells them, so that the new story will become her new memory. Meanwhile, Julie (Andujar), Marjorie's caretaker, moves in with the family to watch over her and confides in Walter.

In time, Walter Prime becomes curious about the real Walter's personal and professional lives and starts asking Jon about them. He appears to desire to know the reason why he couldn't tell his children how much he loved them. Jon tells Walter Prime a family secret that must never be repeated to Marjorie: she and Walter had a son named Damian who committed suicide forty years earlier and, before doing so, killed the beloved family dog Toni II (a black French poodle who looked just like the family's previous dog, Toni) to take her with him. Marjorie hasn't said Damian's name since then. Despite Walter Prime's understanding about not telling her, Marjorie suddenly asks for Damian in a bout of dementia. Tess finds a Bible in the living room table and accuses Julie (who had given it to Marjorie) of taking advantage of Marjorie's condition to religiously manipulate her (since Marjorie has always been an atheist), which prompts Marjorie to become upset and urinate herself.

Later on Tess and Marjorie are sitting on the couch talking. It is soon revealed that Marjorie has died and Tess is talking to a Prime version of Marjorie; Jon recommended the Prime Program for his wife to help her cope with the death of her mother. Tess remains highly skeptical of the Prime program, especially because Marjorie Prime is constantly smiling and appears to be too understanding to truly impersonate Marjorie's real personality. This leads Tess to realize she has chosen the aged version of her mother because this is the version she still has things she needs to say to. Meanwhile, in a flashback to when Walter was alive, he and Marjorie are sitting on the couch watching the nightly news, which shows “The Gates”, an art exhibit by Christo and Jean-Claude that ran in Central Park during February 2005. As was explained in an earlier scene, this is shortly after Walter and Marjorie's son, Damian, kills Toni II and commits suicide. Walter and Marjorie become emotional and embrace one another.

Sometime later, Jon is talking to Tess in the living room. It is then revealed it is a Prime version of her; a year has passed and Tess, apparently still unable to deal with Marjorie's death, had hanged herself during a vacation in Madagascar. Jon brings Tess' granddaughter to meet Tess Prime because she never met the real Tess while she was alive due to Tess' estrangement from her daughter.

Years later, Tess' granddaughter is grown up and Jon is very old. In the house's living room, Walter Prime, Marjorie Prime, and Tess Prime talk about the old days, reliving old memories. They discuss a memory of the dog Toni, believing Tess was the one who picked him out. Walter tells them that Tess didn't pick Toni: Damian did. He picked her because she looked like their old dog, also named Toni, who died before Tess was born and whom she never knew existed. After hearing the story, Marjorie and Tess can remember Damian too. As Walter apologizes for saddening them, Marjorie responds by saying the only thing she can think of is "how nice that we could love somebody".

Cast

 Lois Smith as Marjorie/Marjorie Prime
 Hannah Gross as Young Marjorie
 Jon Hamm as Walter/Walter Prime
 Tim Robbins as Jon
 Geena Davis as Tess/Tess Prime
 Stephanie Andujar as Julie
 Leslie Lyles as Mrs. Salveson

Release
FilmRise acquired distribution rights to the film after its premiere at the 2017 Sundance Film Festival.

Reception

Critical response
Marjorie Prime received critical acclaim. It holds an approval rating of 90% on Rotten Tomatoes based on 92 reviews, with an average rating of 7.42/10. The website's critical consensus reads, "Intimate in setting yet ambitious in scope, the beautifully acted Marjorie Prime poses thought-provoking questions about memory, humanity, and love." On Metacritic, the film has a weighted average score of 82 out of 100, based on 28 critics, indicating "universal acclaim".

Accolades 
The film won the Sloan Feature Film Prize, which includes a $20,000 cash award, presented at the 2017 Sundance Film Festival. The award jury awarded the film for its "imaginative and nuanced depiction of the evolving relationship between humans and technology, and its moving dramatization of how intelligent machines can challenge our notions of identity, memory and mortality.” The jury members were Heather Berlin, Tracy Drain, Nell Greenfieldboyce, Nicole Perlman, and Jennifer Phang.

References

External links
 

2017 films
2010s science fiction drama films
American films based on plays
American science fiction drama films
Films directed by Michael Almereyda
Films set in Long Island
Films set in the future
Films shot in New York (state)
2017 drama films
Alfred P. Sloan Prize winners
Sundance Film Festival award winners
2017 independent films
2010s English-language films
2010s American films